Marina Shmonina (born 9 February 1965) is an athlete who represented the Soviet Union, and later Russia. She specialized in the 400 metres and 4 x 400 metres relay.

Born in Tashkent, Uzbek SSR, Shmonina competed for the Unified Team at the 1992 Summer Olympics, in the heats of the relay competition. When the team of Yelena Ruzina, Lyudmila Dzhigalova, Olga Nazarova and Olga Bryzgina won the final, Shmonina was also awarded the gold medal. Shmonina was hailed in Uzbekistan as the first Uzbek athlete to win an Olympic gold medal.

Doping 
At the 1993 IAAF World Indoor Championships Shmonina tested positive for the anabolic steroid stanozolol and the Russian 4x400 relay team lost the gold medal. Shmonina was also handed a four-year ban from sports for the anti-doping rule violation.

Achievements

 At both the 1990 Europeans and 1992 Olympics Shmonina ran in the heats but not the final.
 At the 1993 World Indoors, the Russians were the original winners in 3:28.90. They were disqualified due to Shmonina failing a drugs test.

References

External links
 
 

1965 births
Living people
Doping cases in athletics
Russian sportspeople in doping cases
Russian female sprinters
Soviet female sprinters
Uzbekistani female sprinters
Athletes (track and field) at the 1992 Summer Olympics
Olympic gold medalists for the Unified Team
Olympic athletes of the Unified Team
Sportspeople from Tashkent
Olympic gold medalists in athletics (track and field)
Goodwill Games medalists in athletics
World Athletics Indoor Championships medalists
Medalists at the 1992 Summer Olympics
Competitors at the 1990 Goodwill Games
Olympic female sprinters